Carme Valls i Llobet (born 1945) is a Spanish endocrinologist and politician. She is President of CAPS, Centro de Análisis y Programas Sanitarios.

She was a deputy in the 6th and 7th assemblies of the Parliament of Catalonia, from 1999 to 2006, representing Barcelona for the Socialists' Party of Catalonia.

She was born in Barcelona on 21 May 1945.

In 2020 she was awarded the Creu de Sant Jordi.

Selected publications
Mujeres invisibles para la Medicina: Desvelando nuestra salud (2021)
Medio ambiente y salud: Mujeres y hombres en un mundo de nuevos riesgos (2018)
Mujeres, salud y poder (2009)

References

1945 births
Living people
Spanish women in politics
Spanish women scientists
Women endocrinologists